Oras Oy is a Finnish manufacturer of bathroom and kitchen faucets. The company was founded in Rauma in 1945 by Erkki Paasikivi. Oras is the fourth largest faucet manufacturer in Europe, and it holds 30–80 percent of the market share in Finland. The company has two factories, which are located in Olesno, Poland and Rauma.

Overview
Oras' head office is located in Rauma and its production facilities are located in Finland, Poland, Germany and the Czech Republic. In 2012, it employed approximately 920 people in Europe, of which approximately 600 employees and white-collar workers in Finland. The raw materials and production components are also primarily sourced from Europe. Oras has its own sales organization in more than 15 European countries. Oras' most significant brands are Oras and Hansa.

References

External links
Oras Official Website

Finnish brands
Manufacturing companies of Finland
Rauma, Finland
Valve manufacturers
Bathroom fixture companies
Finnish companies established in 1945
Manufacturing companies established in 1945